Seshachala Educational Society was established in 1998 by its founder and chairman Sri KLN Moorthy, in Puttur of Chittoor district, Andhra Pradesh, India. The society offers education from preschool to postgraduate and has founded institutions in Puttur and Tirupathi.

References

External links
 http://www.maplandia.com/india/andhra-pradesh/chittoor/puttur/
 http://wikimapia.org/country/India/Andhra_Pradesh/Puttur/

Educational institutions established in 1998
Engineering colleges in Andhra Pradesh
Universities and colleges in Tirupati
All India Council for Technical Education
1998 establishments in Andhra Pradesh